Christian Wenger (born 12 January 1925) was a Swiss cross-country skier. He competed in the men's 50 kilometre event at the 1956 Winter Olympics.

References

External links
 

1925 births
Possibly living people
Swiss male cross-country skiers
Olympic cross-country skiers of Switzerland
Cross-country skiers at the 1956 Winter Olympics
Place of birth missing